Good Girls is an American crime comedy-drama television series created by Jenna Bans that aired on NBC from February 26, 2018, to July 22, 2021. The series is executive produced by Bans, Dean Parisot, and Jeannine Renshaw for Universal Television. In June 2021, the series was canceled after four seasons.

Synopsis
The series follows three suburban Michigan mothers, two of whom are sisters, who are having a hard time trying to make ends meet. They are tired of having everything taken away from them, so they decide to pull off an unlikely heist by robbing a supermarket, only to discover that they are in for more than they expected. Their successful robbery attracts the attention of the store manager after he recognizes one of the women, but for a different reason altogether than just the money, and the attention of a mob gang that served the supermarket as a front. Now caught in a series of gang heists, debts, secrets, and familial crises, the others slowly descend down a path they never thought of going down before.

Cast and characters

Main
 Christina Hendricks as Elizabeth "Beth" Boland, a mother of four and housewife whose car salesman husband of 20 years cheated on. She is the unofficial leader of the group and grows to enjoy life as a criminal.
 Retta as Ruby Hill, Beth's best friend, a waitress who is struggling to pay for her daughter Sara's kidney disease and medical treatments.
 Mae Whitman as Annie Marks, Beth's younger sister and mother of Ben. Ben was born when Annie was still a teenager. Annie works at Fine & Frugal for a majority of the series.
 Reno Wilson as Stanley Hill, Ruby's mall-cop-turned-actual-cop husband. He finds out about Ruby's criminal activities and, despite initially being against it, does his best to ensure she is not caught.
 Manny Montana as Christopher, also known as Rio, a high-ranking criminal who has a money-laundering business. He supports his business through counterfeiting, pills, cars and other creative ways. He takes a particular interest in Beth, forming a complicated relationship with her.
 Lidya Jewett as Sara Hill, Ruby's and Stan's daughter who has kidney disease.
 Isaiah Stannard as Ben Marks, Annie and Gregg's son, who comes out as a transgender boy in season 2. He was previously referred to as Sadie before coming out.
 Matthew Lillard as Dean Boland, Beth's cheating car salesman husband who made bad decisions with their money, forcing her to rob a grocery store to fix his mistakes. Dean was a senior in high school when he asked Beth to go to their prom together, beginning their long-term relationship.

Recurring
 David Hornsby as Leslie "Boomer" Peterson (seasons 1–2, guest season 3), Annie's deplorable boss at Fine & Frugal. Leslie pursues a relationship with Mary Pat by attending her church and running into her in planned ways.
 James Lesure as FBI Agent Jimmy Turner (seasons 1–2, guest season 3), who is investigating Rio and, later, the women. He forms a fixation on specifically arresting Beth.
 June Squibb as Marion Peterson (seasons 1–2), Leslie's grandmother from whom he was stealing. She and Annie form an unexpected bond.
 Zach Gilford as Gregg, Ben's father and Annie's ex-husband who was trying to sue for full custody. He has an affair with Annie despite his wife, Nancy, being pregnant, later leaving Nancy because he is still in love with Annie.
 Sally Pressman as Nancy (seasons 1–2, guest seasons 3–4), Gregg's wife who gives birth to a boy named Dakota after Gregg leaves her.
 Allison Tolman as Mary Pat (seasons 1–2), an unlikely wolf in sheep's clothing who complicates the ladies' lives.
 Braxton Bjerken as Kenny Boland (seasons 1–4), as Beth's and Dean's eldest son.
 Danny Boyd as Harry Hill as Ruby's and Stan's son.
 Mason Shea Joyce as Danny Boland (seasons 2–4), Beth's and Dean's son. Portrayed by Sutton Johnston in season 1.
 Everleigh McDonell as Jane Boland (seasons 2–4), Beth's and Dean's daughter. Portrayed by Mila Middleswarth in season 1.
 Scarlett Abinante as Emma Boland (seasons 2–4), Beth's and Dean's daughter. Portrayed by Kaitlyn Oechsle in season 1.
 Caleb Emery as Baby Tyler (seasons 1–2, guest seasons 3–4)
 Sam Huntington as Noah (season 2), Annie's love interest. He is an undercover FBI agent who, in order to get close to Annie, poses as her new Fine & Frugal boss after Boomer's disappearance.
 Noureen DeWulf as Krystal (seasons 3–4), a stripper who appears to have a crush on Stanley. Her real name is Diane.
 Rob Heaps as Dr. Josh Cohen (season 3, guest season 4), a child psychologist attending Annie
 Ethan Suplee as Gil (season 3), a former inmate working for a moving company. Beth enlists him to move the printed cash.
 Carlos Aviles as Mick (seasons 3–4)
 Ione Skye as Gayle Meyer (season 3)
 Lauren Lapkus as Phoebe Donnegan (seasons 3–4), a Secret Service agent who has been tracking the printed counterfeit cash
 Rodney To as Henry (season 3, guest season 4)
 Andrew McCarthy as Mr. Fitzpatrick (season 4, guest season 3)
 Jonathan Silverman as Dave (season 4)
 Shane Coffey as Kevin (season 4, guest season 3)
 Niko Nicotera as Gene (season 4), Stan's boss at the strip club.
 Breckin Meyer as Vance (season 4)
 Ignacio Serricchio as Nick (season 4)
 Jordan Belfi as Z (season 4)

Episodes

Series overview

Season 1 (2018)

Season 2 (2019)

Season 3 (2020)

Season 4 (2021)

Production

Development

On May 7, 2018, NBC renewed the series for a second season, which premiered on March 3, 2019. On April 12, 2019, NBC renewed the series for a third season of 16 episodes, which premiered on February 16, 2020. Because of the COVID-19 pandemic in the United States, the third season was cut down to 11 episodes. On May 15, 2020, the series was renewed for a fourth season, which premiered on March 7, 2021. On June 25, 2021, NBC canceled the series after four seasons and opted to not shop to other networks.

Casting
Originally, Kathleen Rose Perkins was cast in the role of Beth in the pilot. Later it was confirmed she had left the project and the role would be recast. Christina Hendricks was announced as her replacement on July 10, 2017. On September 17, 2019, Jackie Cruz was cast in a recurring role for the third season. On November 13, 2020, Jonathan Silverman was cast in a recurring role for the fourth season. On April 13, 2021, Jordan Belfi joined the cast in a recurring role for the fourth season.

Filming
The first season was filmed at Third Rail Studios in Doraville, Georgia. For the second season, the series relocated its production to Los Angeles to take advantage of tax incentives provided by the California Film Commission under its "Program 2.0" initiative.

Reception

Ratings

Overall

Season 1

Season 2

Season 3

Season 4

Critical response
The review aggregator website Rotten Tomatoes reported an approval rating of 63% based on 51 reviews of the first season of the series, with an average rating of 6.3/10. The website's critical consensus reads, "The plot of Good Girls may not be entirely believable, but the strong performances from its lead actresses are." Metacritic assigned a weighted average score of 60 out of 100, based on 22 critics, indicating "mixed or average reviews".

The second season of the series holds a rating of 100% with an average of 6.3/10 from 9 critics. The third season of the series holds a rating of 100% with an average of 8.5/10, from 6 critics. The fourth season has an approval rating of 83% based 6 reviews, with an average ratings of 
7.4/10.

Accolades

Notes

References

External links
 
 

2018 American television series debuts
2021 American television series endings
2010s American comedy-drama television series
2010s American crime drama television series
2020s American comedy-drama television series
2020s American crime drama television series
American crime comedy television series
English-language television shows
NBC original programming
Television productions suspended due to the COVID-19 pandemic
Television series by Universal Television
Television shows filmed in Georgia (U.S. state)
Television shows filmed in Los Angeles
Television shows set in Detroit
Transgender-related television shows
Television shows set in Michigan